Davi Samuel Alcolumbre Tobelem (born 19 June 1977) is a Brazilian politician member of Brazil Union (UNIÃO). He is Senator for Amapá and, in the biennium 2019–2020, former President of the Federal Senate from 2019 to 2021 and former President of the National Congress of Brazil.

From Moroccan ascendency, Davi Alcolumbre was the first Jew to hold the office of President of the Senate in the history of Brazil.

Biography
Davi Alcolumbre was born in Macapá, in 1977, the son of Samuel José Tobelem and Julia Peres Alcolumbre, who were cousins. His family is of Sephardic origin and migrated from Morocco to Brazil, initially to the state of Pará. His paternal grandparents were José Tobelem and Maey Alcolumbre Tobelem, both Moroccan-born. His maternal grandfather was Isaac Alcolumbre, born in Belém, Brazil, to Moroccan immigrants from Tangier.

He was City Councillor in Macapá from 2001 to 2003, when he was member of the Democratic Labor Party (PDT). In 2002, he was elect Federal Deputy for the state of Amapá, being re-elect in 2006 and 2010. Currently, he is member of Democrats, party which Alcolumbre was member of the National Directory and also the youth wing.

Davi Alcolumbre was candidate for the Senate in the 2014 elections, being elect with 36.26% of the valid voted, defeating the favorite former Senator Gilvam Borges. He took office on 1 February 2015. Alcolumbre is one of the 13 senators who didn't graduate on college.

In 2015, he was elect Chair of the Senate Regional Development and Tourism Committee.

In July 2017, voted against the removal of senator Aécio Neves in the Senate Ethics Council.

In October 2017, voted to keep Aécio in office, defeating a decision of the First Class of the Supreme Federal Court in a lawsuit which Aécio was accused of corruption and obstruction of justice for asking for R$ 2 million (US$  in 2017) to the owner of JBS Joesley Batista.

In 2019, as the only member of the previous Senate Director Board, began the Presidency of the House and, on 1 February, articulated to preside the session which would chose the new President being, however, deprecated by the senior member of the Senate, senator José Maranhão (MDB) of the leading of the session, which the main rivals were Alcolumbre himself (support by Onyx Lorenzoni, Chief of Staff, and the Democratas party) and senator Renan Calheiros (MDB).

On 2 February, Alcolumbre was elected in the first round, with 42 votes, the new President of the Federal Senate, due to the support of opponents of Renan Calheiros and part of the supporting base of President Jair Bolsonaro.

On 18 March 2020, Alcolumbre tested positive for COVID-19.

References

External links
 Davi Alcolumbre’s official Senate profile

|-

Living people
1977 births
Brazilian Sephardi Jews
Members of the Federal Senate (Brazil)
Presidents of the Federal Senate (Brazil)
Democrats (Brazil) politicians
Brazil Union politicians
People from Macapá
People from Amapá
Jewish Brazilian politicians
Brazilian people of Moroccan-Jewish descent